Pyotr Ivanovich Chardynin ( – 14 August 1934) was a Russian and Soviet film director, screenwriter and actor. One of the pioneers of the film industry in the Russian Empire, Chardynin directed over a hundred silent films during his career.

Biography 
Chardynin was born Pyotr Ivanovich Krasavtsev on 10 February 1873 in Simbirsk, Russian Empire (now Ulyanovsk, Russia). In 1890, he was admitted to the Drama School of Moscow Philharmonic Society, where he studied under Vladimir Nemirovich-Danchenko from 1891. After graduating, he adopted stage name of Chardynin and started both acting and directing career in provincial Russian theatres in Belgorod, Orekhovo-Zuevo, Uralsk and Vologda.

He first began experimenting with short films in 1907. In 1908, Chardynin joined the troupe at Vvedensky Narodny Dom in Moscow and, as a part of it, started his film acting career in A 16th Century Russian Wedding and Song About the Merchant Kalashnikov. In 1909, Chardynin debuted as a director with The Power of Darkness and soon become the principal director for Aleksandr Khanzhonkov's film company.  In 1916, however, facing the serious competition from Yevgeni Bauer, he left the Khanzhonkov and, together with Vera Kholodnaya and several other leading actors, joined Dmitriy Kharitonov's studio in Odessa. There, Chardynin made several successful films including Be Silent, My Sorrow, Be Silent. Being one of the most productive Russian filmmakers, he directed about 120 or 200 films by 1918, mainly specializing on literary adaptations.

From 1920 to 1923, Chardynin lived and worked in Italy, France, Germany and Latvia. In 1923, he returned to the USSR to work at Odessa Film Studio, where he directed several costume dramas and epics about the history of Ukraine. During the early 1930s, Chardynin was banned from directing by Soviet authorities and died in 1934 from liver cancer.

Personal life
One of Chardynin’s several marriages was to director Margarita Barskaia (Chardynina), who worked as an assistant director on eleven of his films in the 1920s.

Filmography 

 The Power of Darkness (short), 1909
 Dead Souls (short), 1909
 Charodeyka (The Enchantress) (short), 1909 
 Boyarin Orsha (short), 1910
 Idiot (short), 1910
 The Queen of Spades (short), 1910
 Vadim (short), 1910
 Na boykom meste, 1911
 The Kreutzer Sonata, 1911
 Rabochaya slobodka (short), 1912
 Voyna i mir (short), 1913
 Uncle's Apartment (co-director), 1913
 1613 (co-director), 1913
 Obryv, 1913
 The Little House in Kolomna (short), 1913
 V rukakh besposhchadnogo roka (short), 1914
 Ty pomnish''' li?, 1914
 Revnost (short), 1914
 Zhenshchina zavtrashevo dnya, 1914
 Sorvanets, 1914
 Chrysanthemums, 1914
 Vlast tmy (short), 1915
 Ubogaya i naryadnaya, 1915
 Komediya smerti (short), 1915
 Katyusha Maslova, 1915
 Hromonozhka, 1915
 Peterburgskiye trushchobi (co-director), 1915
 Natasha Rostova, 1915
 Potop, 1915
 Teni grekha, 1915
 Venetziansky chulok, 1915
 Lyubov statskogo sovetnika, 1915
 Drakonovskiy kontrakt, 1915
 Mirages (short), 1915
 By the Fireplace, 1917
 Be Silent, My Sorrow, Be Silent, 1918
 Rasskaz o semi poveshennykh, 1920
 Dubrowsky, der Räuber Ataman (as Peter Tschardin), 1921
 Ukraziya, 1925
 Taras Shevchenko'', 1926

See also 
 Vera Kholodnaya
 Ossip Runitsch
 Vitold Polonsky
 Vsevolod Meyerhold

References

External links 
 

1873 births
1934 deaths
Film directors from the Russian Empire
Male screenwriters
Writers from the Russian Empire
Soviet male actors
Male actors from the Russian Empire
Silent film directors
Deaths from liver cancer
Screenwriters from the Russian Empire